Theo van Duivenbode (born 1 November 1943) is a Dutch former footballer who played for Ajax and Feyenoord and was part of their European and Intercontinental Cup victory in 1970.

Club career
Born in Amsterdam, van Duivenbode made his senior debut on 3 May 1964 for hometown club Ajax against Sparta but was deemed not hard enough by manager Rinus Michels after they lost the 1969 European Cup Final to Milan. He subsequently left the club for arch rivals Feyenoord, with whom he did win international silverware. He was the third Ajax player in history to join Feyenoord after Eddy Pieters Graafland and Henk Groot and also scored the only goal in his first Klassieker in a Feyenoord-shirt, on 2 November 1969.

He finished his career at Haarlem, his final game was in December 1974 against Excelsior.

International career
Van Duivenbode made his debut for the Netherlands in a September 1968 FIFA World Cup qualification match against Luxembourg and earned a total of 5 caps, scoring no goals. His final international was an October 1970 UEFA Euro qualification match against Yugoslavia.

Personal life
After retiring as a player he became a successful businessman and was a commercial director at insurance company Stad Rotterdam Verzekeringen, who had been shirtsponsoring Feyenoord.

Football administration
Van Duivenbode worked for Ajax in different positions and also was a member of the board at the KNVB. As of 2017, he has a seat in the Board of Supervisors of Ajax.

Honours
Ajax
Eredivisie: 1965–66, 1966–67, 1967–68
KNVB Cup: 1966–67

Feyenoord
Eredivisie: 1970–71
European Cup: 1969–70
Intercontinental Cup: 1970

References

External links
 
 Profile - Feyenoord

1943 births
Living people
Footballers from Amsterdam
Association football fullbacks
Dutch footballers
Netherlands international footballers
Feyenoord players
AFC Ajax players
HFC Haarlem players
Eredivisie players
Dutch business executives
AFC Ajax non-playing staff
UEFA Champions League winning players